Ružena is a feminine given name, meaning Rose. It may refer to:

 1856 Růžena, an asteroid

People with the given name
Růžena Jesenská, Czech teacher, poet and writer
Ružena Bajcsy, specialist in robotics
Růžena Košťálová, Czechoslovak sprint canoeist
Růžena Maturová
Růžena Novotná, Czechoslovak slalom canoeist
Růžena Svobodová, Czech writer
Růžena Nasková, Czech actress
Růžena Vacková, Czech theoretist and stage critique
Růžena Šlemrová, Czech actress

Czech feminine given names
Slovak feminine given names